The Platinum Classic was a golf tournament on the Sunshine Tour. It was founded in 1995, and was played at the nine-hole Mooinooi Golf Club, North West Province, South Africa, although the first event had to be moved to Rustenburg when the greens at Mooinooi were vandalised.

The tournament was traditionally held in October but was moved to March in 2012 and September in 2013. The prize fund was R500,000.

Winners

References

External links
Sunshine Tour - official site
Mooinooi Golf Club

Former Sunshine Tour events
Golf tournaments in South Africa
Sport in North West (South African province)
Recurring sporting events established in 1995
Recurring sporting events disestablished in 2013